The Son of the Wolf is a 1922 American silent Western film directed by Norman Dawn and starring Edith Roberts, Wheeler Oakman and Sam Allen. It is a northern set in Canada's Yukon and is based on a short story of the same name by Jack London.

Cast
Edith Roberts as Chook-Ra
Wheeler Oakman as Scruff Mackenzie
Sam Allen as Father Roubeau
Edward Cooper as Ben Harrington
Fred Kohler as Malemute Kid
Thomas Jefferson as Chief Thling Tinner
Fred R. Stanton as The Bear 
Arthur Jasmine as The Fox
Eagle Eye as Shaman

References

Bibliography

External links

1922 Western (genre) films
Silent American Western (genre) films
American silent feature films
American black-and-white films
1920s English-language films
Films directed by Norman Dawn
Film Booking Offices of America films
Films set in Yukon
Northern (genre) films
Films based on works by Jack London
Films based on short fiction
1920s American films